Juliette Mikaela Kemppi (born 14 May 1994) is a Finnish professional footballer who plays as a forward for IFK Kalmar in the Damallsvenskan. She previously played for FA WSL team, Bristol City, LSK Kvinner FK in the Norwegian Toppserien, AIK in the Swedish Damallsvenskan, as well as TPS Turku and Åland United of the Finnish Naisten Liiga.

Club career

After leaving relegated AIK, Kemppi joined Kolbotn Fotball in December 2015.

On 18 August 2018 she signed with Bristol City in the FA Women's Super League.

International
Kemppi made her debut for the Finland women's national team in September 2013 against Kazakhstan. She was also a member of the Finnish squad at the 2014 FIFA U-20 Women's World Cup in Canada and played at the 2013 UEFA Women's Under-19 Championship.

Kemppi has previously played floorball and was a member of Finland's U-19 World Championship winning squad in 2012.

International goals

References

External links

 
 
 
 

1994 births
Finnish women's footballers
Finnish expatriate footballers
Finnish expatriate sportspeople in England
Expatriate women's footballers in England
Living people
Finland women's international footballers
Kansallinen Liiga players
Åland United players
Damallsvenskan players
AIK Fotboll (women) players
Expatriate women's footballers in Sweden
Expatriate women's footballers in Norway
Kolbotn Fotball players
Finnish expatriate sportspeople in Norway
Finnish expatriate sportspeople in Sweden
Kaarinan Pojat players
Women's association football forwards
Turun Palloseura (women's football) players
London City Lionesses players
Bristol City W.F.C. players
People from Kaarina
Sportspeople from Southwest Finland
UEFA Women's Euro 2022 players